Manettia pichinchensis is a species of plant in the family Rubiaceae. It is endemic to Ecuador.

References

pichin
Endemic flora of Ecuador
Near threatened flora of South America
Taxonomy articles created by Polbot